The 2002 FIA Formula One World Championship was the 56th season of FIA Formula One motor racing. It began on 3 March and ended on 13 October after seventeen races.

In the Drivers' Championship, Michael Schumacher finished first or second in every race except for the Malaysian Grand Prix, where he finished third, thus achieving a podium position in every race. He won a then-record 11 Grands Prix, surpassing the previous record of 9 wins, jointly held by himself (1995, 2000 and 2001) and Nigel Mansell (1992). He would also set the record for shortest time in which the World Drivers' Championship had been clinched, securing the title with a win at the French Grand Prix, with 6 races to go in the season. Schumacher took the Drivers' Championship by a then-record 67-point margin over teammate Rubens Barrichello, beating his own previous record for the 2001 season (58 points over David Coulthard) and also gained a new point total record with 144 points, again beating his own previous record of 123 points from the 2001 season. Schumacher and Barrichello helped Scuderia Ferrari Marlboro secure the Constructors' Championship with a points total that equalled the combined sum of points attained by all other constructors collectively. For the 2003 championship, the FIA would change the points system.

Teams and drivers

The following teams and drivers competed in the 2002 FIA Formula One World Championship.

† All engines were 3.0 litre, V10 configuration.

Team changes
 The Prost team was placed into receivership in November 2001, and was liquidated by the receivers in January 2002. The absence of Prost meant that the car numbers 18 and 19 were left unoccupied for the season. Phoenix Finance bought the remains of Prost Grand Prix and attempted to enter Formula One starting at the Malaysian Grand Prix with former Minardi drivers Gastón Mazzacane and Tarso Marques. However, their entry was rejected by the FIA for not purchasing all of the Prost team. They still attempted to race at Malaysia, but race officials prevented them from competing in the event, even with a court appeal.
 Japanese auto maker Toyota entered the championship as a full works team, after much development work in 2001.
 The Benetton team had been sold to Renault in 2000, and was renamed Renault F1 for 2002. The team did not substantially change apart from the name, as Benetton had been running a car with Renault components since 1995.
 Asiatech, who had supplied engines to Arrows in 2001, switched their supply to Minardi for 2002. This replaced Minardi's Cosworth engines (rebadged as European) from the previous season. Completing what was effectively a straight swap, Arrows signed a deal with Cosworth to use their engines for 2002.
 The Arrows team suffered financial collapse after the German Grand Prix, and did not take part in any of the remaining races. An attempt to register for the 2003 season was rejected by the FIA.

Driver changes
 The 2002 season featured several driver line-up changes before the season and more changes during the season proper.
 With three races left to go in the 2001 season, 1998 and 1999 World Champion Mika Häkkinen announced that he was not intending to drive in F1 in 2002. Denying any claim of retirement, he stated that he needed a sabbatical and would return to McLaren at a later time. Häkkinen later officially left McLaren and retired from F1 at the end of 2001, eventually returning to racing in DTM in 2005, despite being linked with the Williams team for a Formula One comeback. Häkkinen's seat at McLaren was taken by his fellow Finn 2007 World Champion Kimi Räikkönen, after he was released by Sauber. Räikkönen was replaced at Sauber by the 2001 Euro Formula 3000 champion Felipe Massa.
 Midway through 2001, Giancarlo Fisichella announced his intention to leave Benetton after 2001 to drive for Jordan. Benetton, renamed as Renault, replaced Fisichella with Jordan driver Jarno Trulli, meaning that Fisichella and Trulli had swapped seats at the two teams. Jordan completed an all-new lineup for 2002 with BAR test driver Takuma Sato, whose position in the large test driver pool at BAR was taken by compatriot Ryo Fukuda. Jean Alesi, who had driven for Jordan at the end of the 2001 season, did not seriously pursue an F1 drive for 2002 and instead signed up a drive with Mercedes in the DTM series. Ricardo Zonta, realising that he had no future at Jordan, left his reserve seat there to drive in the Telefonica World Series, later returning to F1 in 2003 as a test driver for Toyota.
 Heinz-Harald Frentzen, without a drive after the collapse of Prost, joined the Arrows team for 2002. This was his third different team within two seasons, after having been dumped by Jordan mid-season in 2001 and subsequently joining Prost until that team's collapse. Despite being under contract for another season, Jos Verstappen lost his Arrows seat to Frentzen, and the Dutchman was unable to secure a drive at another team. He later resurfaced at Minardi in 2003.
 Fernando Alonso left Minardi after an impressive 2001 campaign, and signed on with Renault as a test driver. Alonso's seat was taken over by Benetton test driver, and International Formula 3000 series runner-up, Mark Webber.
 For their first season in Formula One, Toyota employed Mika Salo (formerly with Sauber in ) and debutant Allan McNish, who had previously driven a Toyota GT-One at Le Mans.
 Luciano Burti, who had driven for both Jaguar and Prost in 2001, left the struggling Prost team before their collapse in order to join Luca Badoer in a test role at Ferrari. Tomáš Enge, who had filled in for the injured Burti at Prost in 2001, was dropped by the team at the end of the 2001 season for financial reasons, and he returned to International Formula 3000 for 2002.
 Antônio Pizzonia was signed to become a Williams test driver alongside Marc Gené. Pizzonia had been driving a Williams sponsored car in the International F3000 series in 2001, and he continued that drive in 2002 along with his test duties at Williams.
 André Lotterer, who drove for the Jaguar Junior Team in the British Formula 3 series in 2001, was signed as a test driver for Jaguar's Formula One team for 2002.

Mid-season changes

 Heinz-Harald Frentzen decided to leave Arrows following the German Grand Prix due to the uncertain future of that team. Arrows collapsed several days later and did not take part in the rest of the season, which also left Enrique Bernoldi without a drive. Frentzen signed with Sauber for the 2003 season, and stood in for Felipe Massa in the United States Grand Prix, for which the Brazilian had incurred a 10-position penalty from the previous race in Monza, thereby eliminating Massa's penalty.
 BAR test driver Anthony Davidson made his Formula One debut when he replaced Alex Yoong at Minardi for the Hungarian and Belgian Grands Prix. The team suspended the Malaysian after he failed to qualify for the third occasion in 2002. Minardi had planned to replace Yoong with Justin Wilson, but Wilson was too tall to fit into the car in accordance with the safety requirements.

Season calendar
{|class="wikitable" width=650px style="font-size: 85%;"
|-
! Round
! Grand Prix
! Circuit
! Date
|-
! 1
| Australian Grand Prix
|  Melbourne Grand Prix Circuit, Melbourne
| 3 March
|-
! 2
| Malaysian Grand Prix
|  Sepang International Circuit, Kuala Lumpur
| 17 March
|-
! 3
| Brazilian Grand Prix
|  Autódromo José Carlos Pace, São Paulo
| 31 March
|-
! 4
| San Marino Grand Prix
|  Autodromo Enzo e Dino Ferrari, Imola
| 14 April
|-
! 5
| Spanish Grand Prix
|  Circuit de Catalunya, Montmeló
| 28 April
|-
! 6
| Austrian Grand Prix
|  A1-Ring, Spielberg
| 12 May
|-
! 7
| Monaco Grand Prix
|  Circuit de Monaco, Monte Carlo
| 26 May
|-
! 8
| Canadian Grand Prix
|  Circuit Gilles Villeneuve, Montreal
| 9 June
|-
! 9
| European Grand Prix
|  Nürburgring, Nürburg
| 23 June
|-
! 10
| British Grand Prix
|  Silverstone Circuit, Silverstone
| 7 July
|-
! 11
| French Grand Prix
|  Circuit de Nevers Magny-Cours, Magny-Cours
| 21 July
|-
! 12
| German Grand Prix
|  Hockenheimring, Hockenheim
| 28 July
|-
! 13
| Hungarian Grand Prix
|  Hungaroring, Mogyoród
| 18 August
|-
! 14
| Belgian Grand Prix
|  Circuit de Spa-Francorchamps, Stavelot
| 1 September
|-
! 15
| Italian Grand Prix
|  Autodromo Nazionale di Monza, Monza
| 15 September
|-
! 16
| United States Grand Prix
|  Indianapolis Motor Speedway, Speedway
| 29 September
|-
! 17
| Japanese Grand Prix
|  Suzuka Circuit, Suzuka
| 13 October
|-
| colspan="4" style="background-color:#EAECF0;text-align:center" align="bottom" |Sources:|}

Results and standings

Grands Prix

Scoring system

Points were awarded to the top six finishers:

World Drivers' Championship standingsNotes: – Driver did not finish the Grand Prix but was classified, as he completed more than 90% of the race distance.

World Constructors' Championship standingsNotes:'''
 – Driver did not finish the Grand Prix but was classified, as he completed more than 90% of the race distance.
Official FIA Championship classifications listed the Constructors' Championship results as Scuderia Ferrari Marlboro, BMW WilliamsF1 Team, West McLaren Mercedes, etc.

References

External links

formula1.com – 2002 drivers standings (archived)
formula1.com – 2002 teams standings (archived)

Formula One seasons
 
Formula 1